Ewondo Populaire, also known as Pidgin A70, is a Beti-based pidgin of Cameroon, spoken in the area of the capital Yaoundé.

References

Bantu-based pidgins and creoles
Beti languages